Mordellistena rufotestacea is a species of beetle in the genus Mordellistena of the family Mordellidae. It was described by Motsch in 1863.

References

Beetles described in 1863
rufotestacea